François Benjamin Pierre Joseph Cadoret (13 February 1887 – 24 June 1948) was a French politician.

Cadoret was born in Riec-sur-Belon on 13 February 1887. The family oyster farm and business, Les Huitres Cadoret, had been founded in 1880, and Cadoret began working there. He was elected to the municipal council in 1912, and became mayor in 1919, a post he retained until his death. He sat in the Chamber of Deputies from 1930 to 1936, and led the French Rugby League from 1934 to 1941. He later led fishery organizations. He received knighthood of the Legion of Honor, and died on 24 July 1948, aged 61.

References

1887 births
1948 deaths
Members of the 15th Chamber of Deputies of the French Third Republic
Mayors of places in Brittany
Chevaliers of the Légion d'honneur
French sports executives and administrators
People from Finistère
19th-century French people
20th-century French people